is a passenger railway station in located in the city of Higashiōsaka, Osaka Prefecture, Japan, operated by West Japan Railway Company (JR West).

Lines
JR Nagase Station is served by the Osaka Higashi Line, and is located 15.9 kilometers from Shin-Osaka Station.

Station layout
The station has one island platform, capable of accommodating eight-car trains, with the station building underneath. The station is staffed.

Platforms

Adjacent stations

 Shogakuji Signal Box is located between this station and Shin-Kami Station, and the signal box connects to Kudara Kamotsu Terminal via the Kansai Line Freight Branch.

History 
The station was initially planned under the provisional name . JR West preferred Nagase, a widely known place name, for the definite station name rather than obscure Kashida, but since there is a separate Nagase Station on Kintetsu Osaka Line, the station was finally named JR Nagase.

23 August 2007 – Press release by JR West of the determination of the station name as JR Nagase
15 March 2008 – Opening of the station

Passenger statistics
In fiscal 2019, the station was used by an average of 3282 passengers daily (boarding passengers only).

Surrounding area
Higashi Osaka City Kashita Elementary School
Higashi Osaka City Nagase Nishi Elementary School
Higashi Osaka City Taiheiji Elementary School
Higashi Osaka City Kashiwada Junior High School

See also
 List of railway stations in Japan

References

External links

Official home page 

Railway stations in Osaka Prefecture
Stations of West Japan Railway Company
Railway stations in Japan opened in 2008
 Higashiōsaka